The Men's keirin competition at the 2019 UCI Track Cycling World Championships was held on 28 February 2019.

Results

First round
The first round was started at 14:30. The first two riders from each heat qualified for the next round, all other riders moved to the repechages.

Heat 1

Heat 3

Heat 5

Heat 2

Heat 4

First round repechage
The first round repechage was started at 15:40. The first two riders of each heat qualified for the quarterfinals.

Heat 1

Heat 3

Heat 2

Heat 4

Quarterfinals
The quarterfinals were started at 16:36. The first four riders from each qualified for the semifinals.

Heat 1

Heat 3

Heat 2

Semifinals
The semifinals were started at 19:14. The first three riders from each qualified for the final.

Heat 1

Heat 2

Finals
The finals were started at 20:38.

Small final

Final

References

Men's keirin
2019